The Cape of Hope (French: Le Cap de l'espérance) is a 1951 French-Italian crime film directed by Raymond Bernard and starring Edwige Feuillère, Frank Villard and Jean Debucourt.

It was shot at the Billancourt Studios and on location at various place in the Department of Var. The film's sets were designed by the art director Robert Gys.

Cast

References

Bibliography
 Parish, James Robert. Film Actors Guide: Western Europe. Scarecrow Press, 1977.

External links
 

1951 films
1951 crime drama films
1950s heist films
French crime drama films
Italian crime drama films
French heist films
Italian heist films
Film noir
French black-and-white films
Italian black-and-white films
French films based on plays
Films shot at Billancourt Studios
Films scored by Joseph Kosma
1950s French-language films
1950s Italian films
1950s French films